The Daiwa International was a professional golf tournament that was held in Japan from 1993 to 1995. It was an event on the Japan Golf Tour, and played in November at a different course each year.

Winners

External links
Coverage on Japan Golf Tour's official site

Former Japan Golf Tour events
Defunct golf tournaments in Japan
Recurring sporting events established in 1993
Recurring sporting events disestablished in 1995
1993 establishments in Japan
1995 disestablishments in Japan